"The pen is mightier than the sword" is a metonymic adage, created by English author Edward Bulwer-Lytton in 1839, indicating that the written word is more effective than violence as a means of social or political change. 

Under some interpretations, written communication can refer to administrative power or an independent news media.

Origin 

The sentence was coined by English author Edward Bulwer-Lytton in 1839 for his play Richelieu; Or the Conspiracy. The play was about Cardinal Richelieu, though in the author's words "license with dates and details ... has been, though not unsparingly, indulged". The Cardinal's line in Act II, scene II, was more fully:

The play opened at London's Covent Garden Theatre on 7 March 1839 with William Charles Macready in the lead role. Macready believed its opening night success was "unequivocal"; Queen Victoria attended a performance on 14 March.

In 1870, literary critic Edward Sherman Gould wrote that Bulwer "had the good fortune to do, what few men can hope to do: he wrote a line that is likely to live for ages". By 1888 another author, Charles Sharp, feared that repeating the phrase "might sound trite and commonplace". The Thomas Jefferson Building of the Library of Congress, which opened in 1897, has the adage decorating an interior wall. Although Bulwer's phrasing was novel, the idea of communication surpassing violence in efficacy had numerous predecessors.

The saying quickly gained currency, says Susan Ratcliffe, associate editor of the Oxford Quotations Dictionaries. "By the 1840s it was a commonplace."

Predecessors

Earliest sources
Assyrian sage Ahiqar, who reputedly lived during the early 7th century BCE, coined the first known version of this phrase. One copy of the Teachings of Ahiqar, dating to about 500 BCE, states, "The word is mightier than the sword."

According to the website Trivia Library, the book The People's Almanac lists several supposed predecessors to Bulwer's phrasing. Their first example comes from the Greek playwright Euripides, who died c. 406 BCE. He is supposed to have written: "The tongue is mightier than the blade."

Islamic sources
The Islamic prophet Muhammad is quoted, in a saying narrated by 'Abdullah ibn Amr: "There will be a tribulation that will wipe out the Arabs in which those killed on both sides are in the Hellfire. In that time the spoken word will be stronger than the sword".

Abu'l-Fazl ibn Mubarak, who died in 1602 and was personal scribe and vizier to Akbar the Great, wrote of a gentleman put in charge of a fiefdom having "been promoted from the pen to the sword and taken his place among those who join the sword to the pen, and are masters both of peace and war." Syad Muhammad Latif, in his 1896 history of Agra, quoted King Abdullah of Bokhara (Abdullah-Khan II), who died in 1598, as saying that "He was more afraid of Abu'l-Fazl's pen than of Akbar's sword."

In contrast, Abu Tammam's Ode on the Conquest of Amorium poem intro: "The sword is the truest news [in comparison with] books... In its sharpness, the boundary between seriousness and play".

Early pre-enlightenment sources
In 1529, Antonio de Guevara, in Reloj de príncipes, compared a pen to a lance, books to arms, and a life of studying to a life of war. Thomas North, in 1557, translated Reloj de príncipes into English as Diall of Princes. The analogy would appear in again in 1582, in George Whetstone's An Heptameron of Civil Discourses: "The dashe of a Pen, is more greeuous than the counterbuse of a Launce."

Netizens have suggested that a 1571 edition of Erasmus' Institution of a Christian Prince contains the words "There is no sworde to bee feared more than the Learned pen", but this is not evident from modern translations and this could be merely a spurious quotation.

William Shakespeare in 1600, in his play Hamlet Act 2, scene II, wrote: "... many wearing rapiers are afraid of goosequills."

Robert Burton, in 1621, in The Anatomy of Melancholy, stated: "It is an old saying, A blow with a word strikes deeper than a blow with a sword: and many men are as much galled with a calumny, a scurrilous and bitter jest, a libel, a pasquil, satire, apologue, epigram, stage-play or the like, as with any misfortune whatsoever." After listing several historical examples he concludes: "Hinc quam sit calamus saevior ense patet", which translates as "From this it is clear how much more cruel the pen may be than the sword."

Early modern sources
The French emperor Napoleon Bonaparte (1769–1821), known to history for his military conquests, also left this oft-quoted remark: "Four hostile newspapers are more to be feared than a thousand bayonets." He also said: "There are only two powers in the world, saber and mind; at the end, saber is always defeated by mind." ("Il n'y a que deux puissances au monde, le sabre et l'esprit : à la longue, le sabre est toujours vaincu par l'esprit.").

Thomas Jefferson, on 19 June 1792, ended a letter to Thomas Paine with: "Go on then in doing with your pen what in other times was done with the sword: shew that reformation is more practicable by operating on the mind than on the body of man, and be assured that it has not a more sincere votary nor you a more ardent well-wisher than Y[ou]rs. &c. Thomas Jefferson"

Published in 1830, by Joseph Smith, an account in the Book of Mormon related, "the word had a greater tendency to lead the people to do that which was just; yea, it had more powerful effect upon the minds of the people than the sword".

As motto and slogan
The phrase appeared as the motto of gold pen manufacturer Levi Willcutt during a Railroad Jubilee in Boston, Massachusetts, which ran during the week beginning 17 September 1852.
The motto appears in the school room illustration on page 168 of the first edition of Mark Twain's The Adventures of Tom Sawyer (1876). The words "pen" and "is" are suspiciously close together leading some scholars to speculate that the illustrator, True Williams, deliberately chose the narrow spacing as a subtle obscene prank.
It is the motto of the Alpha Xi Delta sorority. 
It is also the motto of Kaisei Academy in Tokyo, Japan.
In its Latinized form, Calamus Gladio Fortior, it is the motto of Keio University in Tokyo, Japan.
In another Latinized form, "Cedit Ensis Calamo", it is the motto of the Authors' Club of London, founded by Walter Besant in 1891.
In another Latinized form Doctrina Fortior Armis, it is the motto of Hipperholme Grammar School, in West Yorkshire, England.

See also
 Almighty dollar
 Nonviolent resistance

Footnotes

References

Adages
Mottos
Proverbs
Quotations from literature
1830s neologisms
Edward Bulwer-Lytton